Same-sex marriage in South Africa has been legal since the Civil Union Act, 2006 came into force on 30 November 2006. The decision of the Constitutional Court in the case of Minister of Home Affairs v Fourie on 1 December 2005 extended the common-law definition of marriage to include same-sex spousesas the Constitution of South Africa guarantees equal protection before the law to all citizens regardless of sexual orientationand gave Parliament one year to rectify the inequality in the marriage statutes. On 14 November 2006, the National Assembly passed a law allowing same-sex couples to legally solemnise their union 229 to 41, which was subsequently approved by the National Council of Provinces on 28 November in a 36 to 11 vote, and the law came into effect two days later. South Africa was the fifth country in the world and the first in Africa to legalise same-sex marriage.

History

Background
South Africa was the first country in the world to safeguard sexual orientation as a human right in its Constitution. Both the Interim Constitution, which came into force on 27 April 1994, and the final Constitution, which replaced it on 4 February 1997, forbid discrimination on the basis of sex, gender or sexual orientation. These equality rights formed the basis for a series of court decisions granting specific rights to couples in long-term same-sex relationships:
 Langemaat v Minister of Safety and Security (1998) recognised the reciprocal duty of support between same-sex partners, and extended health insurance benefits.
 National Coalition for Gay and Lesbian Equality v Minister of Home Affairs (1999) extended immigration benefits to foreign partners of South African citizens.
 Satchwell v President of the Republic of South Africa (2002) extended remuneration and pension benefits.
 Du Toit v Minister of Welfare and Population Development (2002) allowed same-sex couples to adopt children jointly.
 J v Director General, Department of Home Affairs (2003) allowed both partners to be recorded as the parents of a child conceived through artificial insemination.
 Du Plessis v Road Accident Fund (2003) recognised the claim for loss of support when a same-sex partner is negligently killed.
 Gory v Kolver NO (2006) allowed inheritance of the estate of a partner who died intestate.

The Fourie case

In 2002, a lesbian couple, Marié Fourie and Cecelia Bonthuys, with the support of the Lesbian and Gay Equality Project, launched an application in the Pretoria High Court to have their union recognised and recorded by the Department of Home Affairs as a valid marriage. Judge Pierre Roux dismissed the application on 18 October 2002 on the technical basis that they had not properly attacked the constitutionality of the definition of marriage or the Marriage Act, 1961.

Fourie and Bonthuys requested leave to appeal to the Constitutional Court, but this was denied and the High Court instead granted leave to appeal to the Supreme Court of Appeal (SCA). They applied to the Constitutional Court for direct access, but this was denied on 31 July 2003; the court stated that the case raised complex issues of common and statutory law on which the SCA's views should first be heard.

Fourie and Bonthuys therefore appealed the High Court judgment to the SCA, which handed down its decision on 30 November 2004. The five-judge court ruled unanimously that the common-law definition of marriage was invalid because it unconstitutionally discriminated on the basis of sexual orientation, and that it should be extended to read "Marriage is the union of two persons to the exclusion of all others for life." The court further unanimously noted that because Fourie and Bonthuys had not challenged the Marriage Act, the court could not invalidate it, and, therefore, their marriage could not immediately be solemnized. The court divided, however, on whether the couple should be given an immediate remedy in implementing the new, wider common-law definition of marriage. The majority opinion, written by Judge Edwin Cameron, ruled that the new definition should apply immediately. In a dissenting opinion, Judge Ian Farlam was of the opinion that the court's order declaring the common-law definition invalid should be suspended for two years to allow Parliament to adopt its own remedy for the situation.

The Government of South Africa appealed the SCA's ruling to the Constitutional Court, arguing that a major alteration to the institution of marriage was for Parliament and not the courts to decide, while Fourie and Bonthuys cross-appealed, arguing that the Marriage Act should be altered as Judge Farlam had suggested. In the meanwhile, the Lesbian and Gay Equality Project had also launched a separate lawsuit directly attacking the constitutionality of the Marriage Act, which was originally to be heard in the Johannesburg High Court; the Constitutional Court granted the Project's request to have it heard and decided simultaneously with the Fourie case.

On 1 December 2005, the Constitutional Court handed down its decision: the nine justices agreed unanimously that the common-law definition of marriage and the marriage formula in the Marriage Act, to the extent that they excluded same-sex partners from marriage, were unfairly discriminatory, unjustifiable, and therefore unconstitutional and invalid. In a widely quoted passage from the majority ruling, Justice Albie Sachs wrote:

There was some disagreement about the remedy: the majority (eight of the justices) ruled that the declaration of invalidity should be suspended for a year to allow Parliament to correct the situation, as there were different ways in which this could be done, and the Law Reform Commission had already investigated several proposals. If Parliament did not end the inequality by 1 December 2006, then words would automatically be "read in" to the Marriage Act to allow same-sex marriages. Justice Kate O'Regan dissented, arguing that these words should be read in immediately.

Civil Union Act

On 24 August 2006, the Cabinet approved the Civil Union Bill for submission to Parliament. The bill as initially introduced would only have allowed civil partnerships which would have been open only to same-sex couples and have the same legal consequences as marriage. It also included provisions to recognise domestic partnerships between unmarried partners, both same-sex and opposite-sex. The state law advisers, who screen laws for constitutionality and form, declined to certify the bill, suggesting that it failed to follow the guidelines laid down by the Constitutional Court. The Joint Working Group, a network of LGBT organisations, described the idea of a separate marriage law for same-sex couples as "an apartheid way of thinking".

On 16 September, thousands of South Africans took to the streets in several cities to protest same-sex marriage. The minor opposition African Christian Democratic Party (ACDP) pushed for a constitutional amendment to define marriage as between a man and a woman; this was rejected by the National Assembly's Portfolio Committee on Home Affairs. Public hearings on the bill began on 20 September. On 7 October, the Marriage Alliance organised a march to the Union Buildings in Pretoria to hand a memorandum opposing same-sex marriage to government representatives.

On 9 October, the governing African National Congress (ANC) voted to support the bill. Although the party had been split on the issue, the vote meant that ANC MPs would be obliged to support the bill in Parliament. The full party support came after members of the national executive committee reminded party members that the ANC had fought for human rights, which includes gay rights.

It was originally expected that the National Assembly would vote on the bill on 20 October in order to allow enough time for the National Council of Provinces to debate and vote on it ahead of the 1 December deadline. The vote was repeatedly delayed as the Portfolio Committee on Home Affairs was still involved in discussions. In response to the argument that 'separate but equal' civil partnerships would not comply with the Constitutional Court's ruling, the Portfolio Committee amended the bill to allow either marriages or civil partnerships, and to allow them to both same-sex and opposite-sex couples. The chapter dealing with the recognition of domestic partnerships was removed.

On 13 November, one day before the bill would be read for a final reading in the National Assembly, Defence Minister Mosiuoa Lekota said:

The amended bill was passed by the National Assembly on 14 November by 229 votes to 41, and by the National Council of Provinces on 28 November by 36 votes to 11. Deputy President Phumzile Mlambo-Ngcuka, acting for President Thabo Mbeki, signed it into law on 29 November, and it became law the following day, one day before the Constitutional Court's order would otherwise have come into force. Minister of Home Affairs Nosiviwe Mapisa-Nqakula said the law was only a temporary measure, noting that a fuller marriage law would be formulated to harmonise the several pieces of marriage legislation now in force.

The bill was hailed by gay and liberal activists as another step forward out of the country's apartheid past, while at the same time some clergy and traditional leaders described it as "the saddest day in our 12 years of democracy." Islamic leader Sheikh Sharif Ahmed called the bill a "foreign action imposed on Africa".

The first couple to wed, Vernon Gibbs and Tony Halls, did so in George, the following day, 1 December 2006. They encountered no problems, and a second couple married later that day in the same location. In 2013, South Africa's first traditional same-sex wedding was held for Tshepo Cameron Modisane and Thoba Calvin Sithole in KwaDukuza, KwaZulu-Natal.

In October 2020, the Department of Home Affairs confirmed that it plans to introduce a new draft marriage policy in South Africa, reconciling the diverse marriage laws into a single piece of legislation "that will enable South Africans of different sexual orientation, religious and cultural persuasions to conclude legal marriages", but indicated that the process had been delayed due to the COVID-19 pandemic. In January 2021, the South African Law Reform Commission issued a 300-page discussion paper, offering a number of proposals and alternatives. The commission has called for public comments on its discussion paper. The proposed changes include reforms introducing a default property system across different marriages, as spouses who have not entered into a formal marriage have no statutory rights to share in property which was amassed during the relationship, as well as the legalisation of polyandry.

Law

Three laws currently provide for the status of marriage in South Africa. These are the Marriage Act (Act 25 of 1961), which provides for civil or religious opposite-sex marriages; the Recognition of Customary Marriages Act (Act 120 of 1998), which provides for the civil registration of marriages solemnised according to the traditions of indigenous groups; and the Civil Union Act (Act 17 of 2006), which provides for opposite-sex and same-sex civil marriages, religious marriages and civil partnerships. A person may only be married under one of these laws at any given time.

Couples marrying in terms of the Civil Union Act may choose whether their union is registered as a marriage or a civil partnership. In either case, the legal consequences are identical to those of a marriage under the Marriage Act, except for such changes as are required by the context. Any reference to marriage in any law, including the common law, is deemed to include a marriage or civil partnership in terms of the Civil Union Act; similarly, any reference to husband, wife or spouse in any law is deemed to include a reference to a spouse or civil partner in terms of the Civil Union Act.

Restrictions
The parties to a marriage or civil partnership must be 18 or older and not already married or civilly partnered. The prohibited degrees of affinity and consanguinuity that apply under the Marriage Act also apply under the Civil Union Act; thus a person may not marry his or her direct ancestor or descendant, sibling, uncle or aunt, niece or nephew, or the ancestor or descendant of an ex-spouse.

The Recognition of Customary Marriages Act, 1998 allows, in limited circumstances, a man to marry multiple wives. A person married under the Civil Union Act may not enter into marriage with a second partner until the existing marriage is dissolved.

Solemnisation 

Marriages and civil partnerships must be solemnised by an authorised marriage officer. Government officials (primarily magistrates and Home Affairs civil servants) who are appointed as marriage officers under the Marriage Act are also able to solemnise marriages in terms of the Civil Union Act. Religious leaders may also be appointed as marriage officers under the Civil Union Act, but religious leaders appointed under the Marriage Act are not automatically able to solemnise marriages in terms of the Civil Union Act.

Originally, government marriage officers who had an objection of conscience to solemnising same-sex marriages or civil partnerships were exempted from doing so if they noted their objection in writing to the Minister of Home Affairs. This provision did not apply to religious marriage officers because they are in any case not obliged to solemnise a marriage that would violate the doctrines of their religion. Several constitutional scholars argued that this provision was unconstitutional, calling it "state-sanctioned discrimination" in violation of the right to equality. In July 2017, more than a decade after same-sex marriage was legalised in South Africa, LGBT newspaper Mambaonline reported that 421 (out of 1,130) marriage officers in South Africa were exempt from performing same-sex marriages or civil partnerships, mostly in the Eastern Cape, the Free State and Mpumalanga. A bill to repeal the exemption was introduced by MP Deidre Carter in January 2018. The bill was amended in Parliament to allow officials who previously did not marry same-sex couples to continue doing so for two years. This gave the Ministry of Home Affairs time to implement the new policy. New officials, however, cannot opt out at all for any time. If a branch had an official opting out for the two-year period, they had to have another official available who could perform the marriage. The measure passed the National Assembly on 6 December 2018 and the National Council of Provinces on 1 July 2020. It was signed into law by President Cyril Ramaphosa on 22 October 2020 as the Civil Union Amendment Act, 2020.

Discrimination 
Discrimination against same-sex couples is prohibited (as is all discrimination on the basis of sexual orientation) by section 9 of the Constitution and by the Promotion of Equality and Prevention of Unfair Discrimination Act.

Recognition of foreign unions 
The Civil Union Act makes no explicit provisions for the recognition of foreign same-sex unions. As a consequence of the extension of the common-law definition of marriage, and based on the principle of lex loci celebrationis, a foreign same-sex marriage is recognised as a marriage in South African law. However, the status of foreign forms of partnership other than marriage, such as civil unions or domestic partnerships, is not clear. In a 2010 divorce case, the Western Cape High Court recognised the validity of a British civil partnership as equivalent to a marriage or civil partnership in South African law.

Criticism of the focus on same-sex marriage 
Constitutional scholar Pierre de Vos has questioned the notion that the legalisation of same-sex marriage in South Africa represents the pinnacle of the human rights struggle of members of the LGBT community. He argues that those who are not involved in long-term monogamous relationships and those who cannot come out of the closet and get married because of the threat of victimisation may not see any benefit from the legislation.

Religious performance
Most major religious organisations in South Africa do not perform same-sex marriages in their places of worship. Religious institutions are not obliged to solemnise a marriage that would violate the doctrines of their faith.

The Dutch Reformed Church blesses same-sex unions and allows gay clergy. In 2015, the General Synod, with a 64% majority, decided to recognise same-sex marriages, bless the relationships of same-sex couples and allow gay ministers and clergy (who are not required to be celibate). The decision affected 9 of the 10 synods; with the Namibia Synod being excluded. The decision caused backlash and objections, resulting in it being reversed about a year later. A dozen church members subsequently took the denomination to court to restore the 2015 decision. In 2019, the North Gauteng High Court reversed the decision, allowing for same-sex unions to be blessed by the church. Individual pastors decide whether to bless same-sex marriages; if they are opposed they cannot be compelled to do so.

The Anglican Church of Southern Africa does not permit same-sex marriages. Its marriage policies state that "holy matrimony is the lifelong and exclusive union between one man and one woman". In 2016, it voted against blessing same-sex unions. The decision split the church, with several dioceses deciding to nonetheless proceed with the blessing of same-sex relationships, notably the Diocese of Saldanha Bay. Archbishop Thabo Makgoba expressed disappointment with the decision not to bless same-sex unions, as did former Archbishop Njongonkulu Ndungane. Former Archbishop Desmond Tutu supported the blessing of same-sex unions. In early 2023, the church once again refused to allow blessings of same-sex unions, but directed the synod to develop "guidelines for providing pastoral ministry to those in same-sex relationships" by September 2023.

Statistics
According to the South African Government, over 3,000 same-sex couples had married in South Africa by mid-2010. Statistics South Africa reports that a total of 3,327 marriages and civil partnerships were registered under the Civil Union Act up to the end of 2011; however, this figure only reflects marriages in which at least one of the spouses is a South African citizen or permanent resident. Furthermore, not all marriages under the Civil Union Act are between partners of the same sex, though most opposite-sex couples continue to marry under the Marriage Act, 1961.

The Statistics South Africa data are further broken down by province and year; they show that the majority of same-sex marriages were registered in Gauteng and the Western Cape.

Lonely Planet has named Cape Town (in the Western Cape) one of the world's top 10 "gay wedding destinations".

Public opinion
A 2014 survey found that voters from the Economic Freedom Fighters (EFF) were the most supportive of same-sex marriage, followed closely by voters from the Democratic Alliance (DA) and the African National Congress (ANC).

A 2015 Ipsos poll found that 45% of South Africans supported same-sex marriage, while a further 13% supported civil unions or another form of legal recognition.

A report conducted by the Human Sciences Research Council on behalf of The Other Foundation was described by some media outlets as the first "statistically sound, nationally representative data" on LGBT issues in Africa. The report found that the proportion of those who "strongly agree" with same-sex marriage had increased tenfold from 2012 to 2015, from 1.5% to 9.9%, while the proportion of people "strongly disagreeing" dropped from 48.5% to 23.4%. The total of "agree" and "strongly agree" making 36.6% (13.5% in 2012), while the "disagree" and "strongly disagree" totaled 46% (78.5% in 2012), the remaining being undecided or neutral.

A September–October 2016 survey by the Varkey Foundation found that 54% of 18–21-year-olds supported same-sex marriage in South Africa.

A May 2021 Ipsos poll showed that 59% of South Africans supported same-sex marriage, 12% supported civil partnerships but not marriage, while 15% were opposed to all legal recognition for same-sex couples, and 14% were undecided. In addition, 18% of South Africans had already attended the wedding of a same-sex couple.

See also
 LGBT rights in South Africa
 Marriage in South Africa
 Recognition of same-sex unions in Africa

Notes

References

 
2006 establishments in South Africa
2006 in LGBT history